Pachylinae is the most diverse subfamily of the harvestman family Gonyleptidae, including around 400 valid species. Major groups of species occur in the Brazilian Atlantic forest, Bolivian/Peruvian highlands, Argentina and Chilean temperate forest.

Genera
Currently, 129 genera are recognised:

Acanthopachylopsis H. E. M. Soares & B. A. Soares, 1949
Acanthopachylus Roewer, 1913
Acanthoprocta Loman, 1899
Acrographinotus Roewer, 1929 *= Unduavius Roewer, 1929
Allogonyleptes Roewer, 1917
Anoplogynopsis H. Soares, 1966
Anoplogynus Piza, 1938
Antetriceras Roewer, 1949
Beckeresia H. Soares, 1970
Berlaia Mello-Leitão, 1940
Biconisoma Roewer, 1936
Bristoweia Mello-Leitão, 1924
Bullaepus Roewer, 1930
Bunoplus Roewer, 1927
Calcarogyndes Mello-Leitão, 1932
Caldanatus Roewer, 1943
Camposicola Mello-Leitão, 1924
Camposicoloides B. Soares, 1944
Capichabesia B. Soares, 1944
Carlotta Roewer, 1943
Ceratoleptes H. E. M. Soares & B. A. Soares, 1979
Ceropachylinus Mello-Leitão, 1943
Ceropachylus Mello-Leitão, 1942
Chaquesia B. Soares, 1944
Chauveaua Canals, 1939
Chilebalta Roewer, 1961
Chilegyndes Roewer, 1961
Corralia Roewer, 1913
Discocyrtulus Roewer, 1927
Discocyrtus Holmberg, 1878
Eopachyloides H. Soares, 1970
Eopachylus Mello-Leitão, 1931
Ergastria Mello-Leitão, 1941
Eubalta Roewer, 1923
Eugyndes Roewer, 1923
Eugyndopsiella H. Soares, 1972
Eusarcus Perty, 1833 *= Pygophalangodus Mello-Leitão, 1931
Fonckia Roewer, 1913 *= Diconospelta Canals, 1934
Giupponia Pérez & Kury, 2002
Goodnightiella H. E. M. Soares & B. A. Soares, 1945
Graphinotus C.L.Koch, 1839
Guaraniticus Mello-Leitão, 1933
Gyndesoides Mello-Leitão, 1933
Gyndoides Mello-Leitão, 1927
Gyndulus Roewer, 1929
Harpachylus Roewer, 1943
Huadquina Roewer, 1930
Huasampillia Roewer, 1913
Huralvioides H. Soares, 1970
Hyperpachylus Roewer, 1957
Hypophyllonomus Giltay, 1928
Iandumoema Pinto-da-Rocha, 1996
Ibarra Roewer, 1925
Iguassua Mello-Leitão, 1935
Iguassuoides H. E. M. Soares & B. A. Soares, 1954
Itatiaincola H. E. M. Soares & B. A. Soares, 1948
Izecksohnopilio H. Soares, 1977
Junicus Goodnight & Goodnight, 1947
Juticus Roewer, 1943
Kuryella Özdikmen, 2006
Lacronia Strand, 1942
Marayniocus Acosta, 2005
Maromba H. E. M. Soares & B. A. Soares, 1954
Metabalta Roewer, 1913
Metadiscocyrtus Roewer, 1929
Metagraphinotus Mello-Leitão, 1927
Metagyndes Roewer, 1913
Metagyndoides Mello-Leitão, 1931
Metalycomedes Mello-Leitão, 1927
Metapachyloides Roewer, 1917
Metaphalangodella Roewer, 1915
Meteusarcoides Mello-Leitão, 1922
Meteusarcus Roewer, 1913
Neogonyleptes Roewer, 1913
Neopachylus Roewer, 1913
Neopucroliella Roewer, 1931
Ogloblinia Canals, 1933
Oliverius H. E. M. Soares & B. A. Soares, 1945
Osornogyndes Maury, 1993
Pachylibunus Roewer, 1913
Pachyloidellus Müller, 1918
Pachyloides Holmberg, 1878
Pachylus C.L.Koch, 1839
Pachylusius Mello-Leitão, 1949
Palcapachylus Roewer, 1952
Parabalta Roewer, 1913
Paradiscocyrtus Mello-Leitão, 1927
Paraluederwaldtia Mello-Leitão, 1927
Parapachyloides Roewer, 1913
Paraphalangodus Roewer, 1915
Paraprosontes H. E. M. Soares & B. A. Soares, 1947
Parapucrolia Roewer, 1917
Pareusarcus Roewer, 1929
Passosa Roewer, 1927
Pherania Strand, 1942
Pichitus Roewer, 1959
Pirunipygus Roewer, 1936
Planiphalangodus Roewer, 1929
Platygyndes Roewer, 1943
Polyacanthoprocta Mello-Leitão, 1927
Progyndes Roewer, 1917
Pseudoacrographinotus H. Soares, 1966
Pseudogyndes Mello-Leitão, 1932
Pseudogyndesoides B. Soares, 1944
Pucrolia Sørensen, 1895
Pulocria Mello-Leitão, 1935
Punagraphinotus Soares & Bauab-Vianna, 1972
Punrunata Roewer, 1952
Qorimayus Acosta, 2020
Rhioxyna Soares & Bauab-Vianna, 1970
Riosegundo Canals, 1943
Roeweria Mello-Leitão, 1923
Sadocus <small>Sørensen in L.Koch 1886</small>Schubartesia B. Soares, 1944Singram Mello-Leitão, 1937Soaresia H. Soares, 1945Spinivunus Roewer, 1943Tarmapachylus Roewer, 1956Temucus Roewer, 1943Tingomaria Mello-Leitão in Mello-Leitão & Araujo Feio, 1948Triglochinura Mello-Leitão, 1924Trochanteroceros Canals, 1935Tumbesia Loman, 1899Ubatubesia B. Soares, 1945Uropachylus Mello-Leitão, 1922Victoriaincola H. E. M. Soares & B. A. Soares, 1946Yraguara'' Mello-Leitão, 1937

References

Harvestmen
Arthropod subfamilies